Westervelt House is located in Tenafly, Bergen County, New Jersey, United States. The south wing of the house was built in 1745 by Roelof Westervelt whose grandfather purchased the property in 1695. The central section of the house was added in 1798 and later in 1825 the north wing was added. Ownership of the house remained in the hands of the Westervelt family until 1923. It serves as the oldest standing building in Tenafly. The house was added to the National Register of Historic Places on August 15, 1983.

See also
National Register of Historic Places listings in Bergen County, New Jersey

References

Houses on the National Register of Historic Places in New Jersey
Houses in Bergen County, New Jersey
National Register of Historic Places in Bergen County, New Jersey
Tenafly, New Jersey
New Jersey Register of Historic Places